Hooghly Imambara is a Shia Muslim congregation hall and mosque in Hooghly, West Bengal, India. The construction of the building was started by Muhammad Mohsin in 1841 and completed in 1861. The building is a two storied structure, with a tall clock tower over the entrance gate. The mosque has intricate designs and texts from Quran engraved on the wall. The interior of the mosque is decorated with marbles, candles and hanging lanterns.

Clock 

Hooghly Imambara is famous for its vaunted clock. It is at the middle of the twin towers constructed on the doorway of the main entrance. Each tower, having a height of approximately 150 ft., takes 152 steps to reach its top. The clock has two dials with three bells having weight 80 mds, 40 mds and 30 mds. Smaller bells ring at an interval of 15 minutes and bigger bell rings to signify one hour. The clock requires two people to wind it for half an hour of each week, with a key weighing 20 kg. It was bought for Rs. 11,721 (in 1852) by Syed Keramat Ali from the manufacturer: M/s Black & Hurray Co., Big Ben, London.

Location

It is in Hooghly District. People coming from Kolkata have to take a train (Local or Express) to Naihati Junction. From Naihati, they have to catch the Bandel Local train and they get off at Hooghly Ghat Station. From there, Imambara is in a walking distance. There are rickshaws and autos to ferry visitors to the Imambara from the station.
Or, the best way to come possibly is to go to Howrah Station and avail the straight trains (local EMUs) to Bandel, which are more frequent and less crowded. One needs to get down at Hooghly Station, and take autos/totos/rickshaws to the Imambara.
Visitors should carry their own lunch/snacks, since there are no eateries around the Imambara.

Gallery

See also
 Architecture of Bengal
 Shia Islam in India

References

Buildings and structures in Hooghly district
Mosques in West Bengal
Religious buildings and structures completed in 1861
Tourist attractions in Hooghly district